William "Willie" Alicea Pérez (born February 23, 1972) is a Puerto Rican politician and the current mayor of Aibonito. Alicea is affiliated with the New Progressive Party (PNP) and has served as mayor since 2009.

Education
Has a BA in Business Administration with a concentration in Management from the Interamerican University of Puerto Rico Barranquitas Campus.

Work

References

Living people
Mayors of places in Puerto Rico
New Progressive Party (Puerto Rico) politicians
People from Aibonito, Puerto Rico
1972 births